The 2001 Big South Conference baseball tournament  was the postseason baseball tournament for the Big South Conference, held from May 16 through 20 at Dan Daniel Memorial Park in Danville, Virginia.  All eight teams participated in the double-elimination tournament. The champion, won the title for the fourth time and earned an invitation to the 2001 NCAA Division I baseball tournament.

Format
All teams qualified for the tournament.  The teams were seeded one through eight based on conference winning percentage and played a double-elimination tournament.

Bracket and results

All-Tournament Team

Most Valuable Player
Randy McGarvey was named Tournament Most Valuable Player.  McGarvey was a catcher for Coastal Carolina.

References

Tournament
Big South Conference Baseball Tournament
Big South baseball tournament
Big South Conference baseball tournament